The 1910 Idaho football team represented the University of Idaho in the 1910 college football season.  Idaho was led by sixth-year head coach John "Pink" Griffith and played as an independent. Griffith returned after three years at Iowa, his alma mater, where he was head coach in 1909.

Schedule

 One game was played on Friday (at Washington State in Pullman)

References

External links
Gem of the Mountains: 1912 University of Idaho yearbook (spring 1911) – 1910 football season
Go Mighty Vandals – 1910 football season
Idaho Argonaut – student newspaper – 1910 editions

Idaho
Idaho Vandals football seasons
Idaho football